78 Pegasi is a binary star system in the northern constellation of Pegasus. It is visible to the naked eye as a faint, orange-hued point of light with an apparent visual magnitude of 4.93. The system is located approximately 224 light years from the Sun based on parallax, but is drifting closer with a radial velocity of −8 km/s. The double-star nature of this system was discovered by A. G. Clark in 1862. The components of this system orbit each other over a 630-year period with an eccentricity of 0.11.

The primary member, designated component A, is a magnitude 5.07 giant star with a stellar classification of K0III, having exhausted the supply of hydrogen at its core and expanded to 10 times the Sun's radius. It is a red clump giant, which indicates it is on the horizontal branch and is generating energy through core helium fusion. It has 1.5 times the mass of the Sun and is radiating 57 times the Sun's luminosity from its enlarged photosphere at an effective temperature of 4,898 K. The secondary companion, component B, is magnitude 8.10.

References

K-type giants
Horizontal-branch stars
Binary stars

Pegasus (constellation)
BD+28 4627
Pegasi, 78
222842
117073
8997